Bastow is a surname. Notable people with the surname include:

 Darren Bastow (born 1981), English footballer
 Ian Bastow (born 1971), English footballer 
 James Austin Bastow
 John Bastow (1850–1927), English cricketer
 Tommy Bastow (born 1991), English actor and musician